The Journal of Computational and Applied Mathematics is a peer-reviewed scientific journal covering computational and applied mathematics. It was established in 1975 and is published biweekly by Elsevier. The editors-in-chief are Yalchin Efendiev (Texas A&M University), Taketomo Mitsui (Nagoya University), Michael Kwok-Po Ng (Hong Kong Baptist University) and Fatih Tank (Ankara University). According to the Journal Citation Reports, the journal has a 2021 impact factor of 2.872.

References

External links

Biweekly journals
Applied mathematics
Mathematics journals
Elsevier academic journals
Publications established in 1975
English-language journals
Computational mathematics